Yummy Yummy is the fourth studio album by Australian children's music group the Wiggles. it was released in 1994 by ABC Music. A companion video was also made in 1994, and it was re-recorded in 1998.

Track listing

Personnel

The Wiggles
 Murray Cook – guitar, bass guitar, backing vocals
 Anthony Field – backing vocals, guitar, bass guitar
 Jeff Fatt – piano, organ, accordion, backing vocals
 Greg Page – lead vocals, guitar

Additional musicians
 Tony Henry – drums, percussion
 Greg Truman – backing vocals
 Peter Mackie – guitar
 Trina Leigh – children's voices
 Allison O'Brien – children's voices

Release information
The CD was released in 1994 under ABC for Kids: 8143372.

In 1999, a version distributed by Lyrick Studios was released in the United States.

Charting
In December 2003, the US version of the album reached number 31 on Billboard's Top Heatseekers and number 29 on their Top Independent Albums charts.

Video

Yummy Yummy, released in 1994, is the second video by the Australian children's band the Wiggles. It is the first Wiggles video to feature chroma key backgrounding.

Songs and skits
This is the song and skits list for the original 1994 version:
 Hot Potato
 Shaky Shaky
 Teddy Bear Hug
 D.O.R.O.T.H.Y. (My Favourite Dinosaur)* Greg's magic show skit
 I Am a Dancer
 Crunchy Munchy Honey Cakes
 Numbers Rhumba
 Joannie Works With One Hammer
 The Monkey Dance
 Henry's Dance
 Walk
 Dorothy's Birthday Party (Short Story)

Cast
The Wiggles are:
 Jeff Fatt
 Greg Page
 Murray Cook
 Anthony Field

Sue McAuley portrayed a dancer named Vanessa, and Dorothy's helper. Jacqueline Fallon portrayed Dorothy's helper.  Vanessa Fallon-Rohanna portrayed Lucy Fixit and Henry's helper. Darren Phillips portrayed Henry's helper. Anthony's father John Patrick Field portrayed the cook. Anthony's brother John William Field portrayed Captain Feathersword's helper.

Later video releases
In 2018, the 1994 video version of Yummy Yummy  were released in multiple segments on their YouTube channel as Classic Wiggles.

1998 re-recording

The video was remade and released in 1998 after the theatrical and video releases of The Wiggles Movie and the video release of Wiggly, Wiggly Christmas. Some of the skits such as the short story for Dorothy's Birthday Party were removed. Two new songs, "Pufferbillies" and "Havenu Shalom Alechem", were added. In the North American and UK versions, "Teddy Bear Hug" and "Numbers Rhumba" were replaced by videos featuring the Wiggle Puppets. The Wiggles use logos on their shirts. Anthony wears a blue shirt instead of a green one. Paul Paddick plays Captain Feathersword. Wags the Dog was also featured in the video. Paul Hester, a former drummer for Split Enz and Crowded House, guest starred as Paul the Cook, and was featured in "Fruit Salad".

Songs and skits

Australian version
 Hot Potato
 D.O.R.O.T.H.Y. (My Favourite Dinosaur)
 Pufferbillies
 Henry's Dance
 Walk
 Joannie Works With One Hammer
 The Monkey Dance
 Crunchy Munchy Honey Cakes
 Shaky Shaky
 Teddy Bear Hug
 Havenu Shalom Alechem
 I Am A Dancer* Greg's Magic Show skit
 Numbers Rhumba
 Fruit Salad

North American/UK version
 Hot Potato
 D.O.R.O.T.H.Y. (My Favorite Dinosaur)
 Pufferbillies
 Henry's Dance
 Walk
 Joannie Works With One Hammer
 The Monkey Dance
 Crunchy Munchy Honey Cakes
 Shaky Shaky
 Wigglemix (Wiggle Puppets)
 Havenu Shalom Alechem
 I Am A Dancer* Greg's Magic Show skit
 Go Captain Feathersword Ahoy! (Wiggle Puppets)
 Fruit Salad

Cast
The Wiggles are:
 Murray Cook
 Jeff Fatt
 Greg Page
 Anthony Field

Also featuring:
 Leeanne Ashley as Dorothy the Dinosaur
 Paul Paddick as Captain Feathersword
 Edward Rooke as Wags the Dog
 Donna Halloran and Leanne Halloran as Henry the Octopus
 Paul Hester as the chef

Release history
Yummy Yummy was released on video along with Wiggle Time in the United States on 12 October 1999.

In 2002, the Wiggles released Yummy Yummy and Wiggle Time as a combined DVD of the 1998 versions of Yummy Yummy and Wiggle Time.

In 2019, the 1998 video version of Yummy Yummy  were released in multiple segments on their YouTube channel as Classic Wiggles.

Notes

References

External links

The Wiggles videos
The Wiggles albums
1994 video albums
1998 video albums  
1994 albums
Australian children's musical films